HMS Widgeon may refer to one of several Royal Navy ships named after the Widgeon:

 , a schooner launched in 1806 and wrecked in 1808
 , a packet boat in service until 1884
 , a gunboat launched in 1889 and sold in 1906
 , a gunboat launched in 1904 and sold in 1931
 , a  sloop launched in 1938 and scrapped in 1947

Royal Navy ship names